The following are the national records in athletics in Uganda maintained by the Uganda Athletics Federation (UAF), except as indicated.

Outdoor

Key to tables:

+ = en route to a longer distance

h = hand timing

A = affected by altitude

NWI = no wind information

OT = oversized track (more than 200 metres in circumference)

a = aided road course

Men

Women

Indoor

Men

Women

Notes

References
General
World Athletics Statistic Handbook 2022: National Outdoor Records
World Athletics Statistic Handbook 2022: National Indoor Records
Specific

External links
 Uganda Athletics Federation website

Uganda
records
Athletics
Athletics